The David Parr House is a preserved terraced house in Cambridge, with interior decoration in the Arts and Crafts style, executed by its owner, David Parr, between 1886 and 1926. The house is open to the public for guided tours in small groups.

David Parr was a working-class Victorian decorative artist who worked for the Cambridge firm of F. R. Leach & Sons. The firm was a contractor to leading Arts and Crafts and Gothic Revival architects and designers, and Parr worked on projects for clients such as George Frederick Bodley, William Morris and Charles Eamer Kempe. In 1886 Parr purchased 186 Gwydir Street, a terraced house off Mill Road in Cambridge.  Over 40 years he decorated his own home in the style of the notable interiors he worked on for his employers.

After Parr's death in 1927 his widow, and later his granddaughter, preserved the house interiors over the next 87 years. In 2014 the house was purchased by a charity established to ensure its continued preservation, and a major conservation programme was undertaken. The house opened to the public in May 2019 and became a Grade II* listed building in 2020. At the same time, Leach's showroom at 3 St Mary's Passage was listed Grade II.

References

External links

Historic house museums in Cambridgeshire
Grade II* listed buildings in Cambridge
Arts and Crafts architecture in England
Gothic Revival architecture in Cambridgeshire
History of Cambridge